Cégep à distance is a distance-education CEGEP that offers services which are complementary to those offered by the CEGEP network. It welcomes a diverse student body, many of whom come from the CEGEP network.

History 
Cégep à distance was created in 1991 by the Collège de Rosemont which had been mandated by the Ministère de l'Éducation to develop a distance education CEGEP. Initially known as the Centre collégial de formation à distance, Cégep à distance adopted its new name in 2002. In 2005, the ministry entrusted it with the mandate to develop distance education for the English-speaking community.

Mandate 
The main function of Cégep à distance is to offer through distance education college-level studies programs that lead to a diploma of collegial studies (DCS/DEC) or to an attestation of collegial studies (ACS/AEC), both inside and outside Québec.

As part of that mandate, Cégep à distance may also fulfils the following functions:
 Design and produce distance-education materials.
 Offer CEGEPs and other organizations services related to distance education and recognition of prior learning.
 Conduct studies and research on distance education and develop experimental projects to integrate ICTs into its activities.
 Promote partnership and dialogue with the CEGEPs.
 Promote and develop distance education.
 Develop courses and services in English.

Client groups 
Cégep à distance accepts two types of clients:

 Admitted students enrol directly at Cégep à distance. These are students who come to Cégep à distance to… 
 Take general education courses (common to all DCSs/DECs) or complementary courses to complete a DCS/DEC
 Earn prerequisites needed to enter university
 Earn a DCS/DEC or ACS/AEC to access the job market or make a career change
 Commandite students (visiting students) are enrolled in another CEGEP. Their CEGEP issues a commandite so they can enrol simultaneously at Cégep à distance, usually because one of their courses causes a scheduling conflict or because it is not offered in the current session at their home CEGEP. Cégep à distance works with the other CEGEPs to help their students in their educational pathway and allow them to graduate sooner.

A few facts and figures 
 17,000 students per year, from 16 to 70 years old
 Over 250 courses, including 19 in English
 27,000 courses taken each year

References 

Higher education in Canada
Distance education institutions based in Canada
Canadian educational websites
Education in Quebec